U.S. Route 85 (US 85) is a part of the U.S. Highway System that travels from the Mexican border in El Paso, Texas, north to the Canadian border in Fortuna, North Dakota. In the state of North Dakota, US 85 travels from the South Dakota state line north to the Canadian border.

Route description
US 85 enters North Dakota in the southwest part of the state. The first city on its route is Bowman at the junction of US 12. Continuing north, it passes between North Dakota's two highest points, White Butte and Black Butte. Near Belfield it junctions with Interstate 94 (I-94). After running concurrently with North Dakota Highway 200 (ND 200), it eventually passes through part of the scenic Badlands, crosses the Little Missouri River and passes near the Theodore Roosevelt National Park (North Unit).

Then, at Watford City it travels west for  where it turns back north before Alexander. US 85 continues north as ND 200 turns west toward Montana. South of Williston it crosses the Missouri River. The stretch from Watford City to Williston is in the process of being converted into an undivided four-lane highway, and it should be substantially completed in 2014. After US 2 heads east, US 85 continues north to a concurrency with ND 5.

Major intersections

References

External links

85
 North Dakota
Transportation in Bowman County, North Dakota
Transportation in Slope County, North Dakota
Transportation in Stark County, North Dakota
Transportation in Billings County, North Dakota
Transportation in McKenzie County, North Dakota
Transportation in Williams County, North Dakota
Transportation in Divide County, North Dakota